Dubovka is a rural locality (a village) in Nizhnebaltachevsky Selsoviet, Tatyshlinsky District, Bashkortostan, Russia. The population was 31 as of 2010. There is 1 street.

Geography 
Dubovka is located 20 km southeast of Verkhniye Tatyshly (the district's administrative centre) by road. Verkhnebaltachevo is the nearest rural locality.

References 

Rural localities in Tatyshlinsky District